Rogozin is a Russian male surname, its feminine counterpart is Rogozina. Notable people with the surname include:

 Dmitry Rogozin (born 1963), Deputy Prime Minister of Russia
 Georgy Ragozin (1942–2014), Major General of the Russian Federal Security Service

See also 
 Ragozin
 Rogosin
 Rogozhin
 Rogozov